Armstrong Power Station was a 356 megawatt (MW), coal power plant in Washington Township, Armstrong County along the Allegheny River across from Mahoning Creek and Templeton, Pennsylvania, about  north of Kittanning, Pennsylvania. The plant operated from 1958 to 2012.

History
Armstrong's two units went in service in 1958 and 1959. The facility was owned by Allegheny Energy Supply before merging with Akron, Ohio based FirstEnergy in February 2011.

The power plant was closed on September 1, 2012 by FirstEnergy, along with six other plants in the tri-county grid to comply with federal Environmental Protection Agency (EPA) guidelines that set new Mercury and Air Toxics Standards (MATS) and other environmental and air quality requirements. The decision was made not to invest in some of the smaller plants considering it would be quite expensive to install a scrubber and other air pollution control upgrades to keep the plant in operation.

See also

 List of power stations in Pennsylvania

References

External links

Energy infrastructure completed in 1958
Towers completed in 1982
Former coal-fired power stations in the United States
FirstEnergy
Kittanning, Pennsylvania
Towers in Pennsylvania
Buildings and structures in Armstrong County, Pennsylvania
Chimneys in the United States
1958 establishments in Pennsylvania